Dancing Forever is a compilation album by Taiwanese singer Jolin Tsai. It was released on September 29, 2006, by EMI and Mars. It contains seven new songs, six remixes, and one video that chronicled the Pulchritude Concert at Kaohsiung Cultural Center in Kaohsiung, Taiwan on July 1, 2006. The track, "Marry Me Today", won a Golden Melody Award for Song of the Year.

Background and development 
On May 12, 2006, Tsai released her eighth studio album, Dancing Diva. On May 31, 2006, her manager Howard Chiang revealed that she would kick off her new concert tour in the second half of the year. On July 17, 2006, she announced that she would embark on her second concert tour Dancing Forever World Tour at Hong Kong Coliseum on September 15, 2006. On August 20, 2006, it was revealed that she had recorded the theme song "Dancing Forever" for the concert tour and had filmed the music video yesterday. 

On August 25, 2006, it was revealed that she would release a compilation album titled Dancing Forever in September 2006, which would feature her cover of Faye Wong's "Missing" and Sandy Lam's "Heard That Love's Ever Been Back", she said: "Before my debut, I loved the songs of Faye Wong and Sandy Lam. In my mind, they are always the divas!" On August 30, 2006, it was revealed that the album would feature her cover of Yeh Chi-tien's "Dare to Go to the Cemetery", which would be produced by Wu Bai. On September 7, 2006, she announced that the album would be released on September 29, 2006.

Writing and recording 

The frenzied beat at the beginning of "Dancing Forever" shows a feeling of suspense and calm, with the catchy lyrics cater to the lively attitude of young people. "Missing" was originally sung by Faye Wong, in which Tsai used a plaintive voice to talk about her memories. "Dare to Go to the Cemetery" was originally sung by Yeh Chi-tien. The song was re-arranged to present a strong style of electronic dance music. She used a playful singing voice to perform the song, and the fast rhythm also increases the difficulty of intonation in Taiwanese Hokkien. 

"Heard That Love's Ever Been Back" was originally sung by Sandy Lam, who also recorded an emotional introduction to the Tsai's new version, which serves as a finishing touch. Tsai's singing and Lam's introduction lead the audience to re-experience the multi-faceted joy of love. "Rival in Love" is an up-tempo glam dance song. "Marry Me Today" is a light and romantic ballad which sung with David Tao. The Cantonese version of "Pretence" increasingly reflects the heartfelt helplessness.

Title and artwork 
The album's cover shows Tsai doing yoga poses on a large J-shaped ring, Tsai said: "I had to do yoga-like poses on a specially made super large J-shaped steel ring, pushing the limits of the human body, and my legs had to be stuck in the steel rings for four hours, after which my legs were covered in bruises."

Release and promotion 
On September 18, 2006, Tsai held a press conference for the album in Taipei, Taiwan. On September 29, 2006, she held a promotional event for the album in Taipei, Taiwan. On September 30, 2006, she held an album signing session in Taipei, Taiwan. On October 1, 2006, she held an album signing session in Kaohsiung and Taichung, Taiwan. On June 28, 2006, Sam Chen, EMI Greater China's general manager, said the album had sold more than 50,000 copies in Taiwan. In its first week of release, the album topped the weekly album sales charts, including G-Music and Five Music. It reached number 15 on the 2006 album sales chart of G-Music.

Live performances 
On November 17, 2006, Tsai participated in the Dragon TV television show Let's Shake It and sang "Dancing Forever". On February 3, 2007, she attended the 2007 Hito Music Awards and sang "Marry Me Today" with David Tao. On February 4, 2007, she participated in the Windows Vista Wow Concert, where she sang "Heard That Love's Ever Been Back" and "Dancing Forever", and she sang "Marry Me Today" with David Tao. On February 17, 2007, she participated in the CCTV Spring Festival Gala, where she sang "Marry Me Today" with David Tao. On April 26, 2007, she participated in the Expo Central China 2007 Concert and sang "Marry Me Today" with David Tao.

On June 29, 2007, she participated in the 2006 Music Radio China Top Chart Awards and sang "Marry Me Today" with David Tao. On November 1, 2007, she participated in the CCTV television show Our Chinese Heart and sang "Dancing Forever". On January 11, 2008, she participated in the M Conference and sang "Dancing Forever", and she sang "Marry Me Today" with David Tao. On April 28, 2008, she participated in the opening ceremony of the 4th China International Cartoon & Animation Festival and sang "Dancing Forever", and she sang "Marry Me Today" with David Tao. Since then, Tsai has participated in various events and performed songs from the album.

Singles and music videos 
On August 17, 2006, David Tao and Tsai released the music video of "Marry Me Today", which was directed by Tony Lin. On September 13. 2006, she released the single, "Dancing Forever". On September 16, 2006, she released the music video of "Dancing Forever", which was directed by Jeff Chang, she plays a museum figurine in the video, jumping out of a glass case and transforming into a voluptuous lady, before wearing a red hip-hop tracksuit and dancing with dancers.

On October 2, 2006, she released the music video of "Missing", which was directed by Marlboro Lai. On the same day, she released the music video of "Dare to Go to the Cemetery", which was directed by Marlboro Lai. The music video of "Heard That Love's Ever Been Back" was directed by Marlboro Lai. "Dancing Forever" reached number 46 on Taiwan's Hit FM Top 100 Singles of the Year chart, and "Marry Me Today" topped the chart in the same year.

Critical reception 
Tencent Entertainment's Shuwa commented: "This is Jolin Tsai's second remix album that had promotion, and it's also a warm-up for her second world tour. Compared to Sony's release J9, Dancing Forever features as many as seven new songs (including cover versions), a plethora of gorgeous new looks, and high promotional cost, it was arguably Jolin Tsai's best remix album of all time. It was released shortly after the release of her hit album Dancing Diva, therefore this album could topped the two biggest Taiwan album sales charts in the first week of release, becoming the first best-selling remix album in the history of Taiwanese music."

Accolades 
On January 18, 2007, "Marry Me Today" won a Canadian Chinese Pop Music Chart Award for Top 10 Songs (Mandarin). On February 3, 2007, "Marry Me Today" won a Hito Music Award for Top 10 Songs and Favorite Song. On February 25, 2007, "Marry Me Today" won Family Music Award for Favorite Collaboration. On May 3, 2007, "Marry Me Today" won a Chinese Musicians Exchange Association Award for Top 10 Songs.

On June 16, 2007, "Marry Me Today" won a Golden Melody Award for Song of the Year. On June 29, 2007, "Marry Me Today" won a Music Radio China Top Chart Award for Top Songs. On October 7, 2007, "Marry Me Today" won a Global Chinese Music Award for Favorite Collaboration. On January 13, 2008, "Marry Me Today" won a Migu Music Award for Top Selling Collaboration.

Track listing

Release history

References

External links 
 

2006 compilation albums
EMI Music Taiwan compilation albums
Jolin Tsai compilation albums